Sortase refers to a group of prokaryotic enzymes that modify surface proteins by recognizing and cleaving a carboxyl-terminal sorting signal. For most substrates of sortase enzymes, the recognition signal consists of the motif LPXTG (Leu-Pro-any-Thr-Gly), then a highly hydrophobic transmembrane sequence, followed by a cluster of basic residues such as arginine. Cleavage occurs between the Thr and Gly, with transient attachment through the Thr residue to the active site Cys residue, followed by transpeptidation that attaches the protein covalently to cell wall components.  Sortases occur in almost all Gram-positive bacteria and the occasional Gram-negative bacterium (e.g. Shewanella putrefaciens) or Archaea (e.g. Methanobacterium thermoautotrophicum), where cell wall LPXTG-mediated decoration has not been reported. Although sortase A, the "housekeeping" sortase, typically acts on many protein targets, other forms of sortase recognize variant forms of the cleavage motif, or catalyze the assembly of pilins into pili.

Reaction 
The Staphylococcus aureus sortase is a transpeptidase that attaches surface proteins to the cell wall; it cleaves between the Gly and Thr of the LPXTG motif and catalyses the formation of an amide bond between the carboxyl-group of threonine and the amino-group of the cell-wall peptidoglycan.

Biological role 
Substrate proteins attached to cell walls by sortases include enzymes, pilins, and adhesion-mediating large surface glycoproteins. These proteins often play important roles in virulence, infection, and colonization by pathogens.

Surface proteins not only promote interaction between the invading pathogen and animal tissues, but also provide ingenious strategies for bacterial escape from the host's immune response. In the case of S. aureus protein A, immunoglobulins are captured on the microbial surface and camouflage bacteria during the invasion of host tissues. S. aureus mutants lacking the srtA gene fail to anchor and display some surface proteins and are impaired in the ability to cause animal infections. Sortase acts on surface proteins that are initiated into the secretion (Sec) pathway and have their signal peptide removed by signal peptidase. The S. aureus genome encodes two sets of sortase and secretion genes. It is conceivable that S. aureus has evolved more than one pathway for the transport of 20 surface proteins to the cell wall envelope.

Note that exosortase and archaeosortase are functionally analogous, while not in any way homologous to sortase.

As an antibiotic target 
The sortases are thought to be good targets for new antibiotics as they are important proteins for pathogenic bacteria and some limited commercial interest has been noted by at least one company.

Structure 
This group of cysteine peptidases belong to MEROPS peptidase family C60 (clan C-) and include the members of several subfamilies of sortases.

Another sub-family of sortases (C60B in MEROPS) contains bacterial sortase B proteins that are approximately 200 residues long.

Use in structural biology

The transpeptidase activity of sortase is taken advantage of by structural biologists to produce fusion proteins in vitro. The recognition motif (LPXTG) is added to the C-terminus of a protein of interest while an oligo-glycine motif is added to the N-terminus of the second protein to be ligated. Upon addition of sortase to the protein mixture, the two peptides are covalently linked through a native peptide bond. This reaction is employed by NMR spectroscopists to produce NMR invisible solubility tags and by X-ray crystallographers to promote complex formation.

See also 
 Protein tag
 Bioengineering
 SpyTag/SpyCatcher
 HaloTag
 Inteins

References

Further reading 

; 
 
 
 
 
 
 
 
 
 
 
 
 
 
 
 
 
 
 
 
 
 
 
 
 
 
 
 
 
 
 
 
 
 
 
 
 
 

Enzymes
Membrane proteins